John Kenneth Middleton (21 June 1906 – 24 January 1991) was a British racing cyclist who competed in the 1928 Summer Olympics. He won the silver medal as a member of the British road racing team in the team road race, after finishing 26th in the individual road race.

References

External links
profile

1906 births
1991 deaths
English male cyclists
Olympic cyclists of Great Britain
Cyclists at the 1928 Summer Olympics
Olympic silver medallists for Great Britain
Olympic medalists in cycling
Sportspeople from Coventry
Medalists at the 1928 Summer Olympics